Wallraf is a surname of:
	
 Max Wallraf (18 September 1859 – 6 September 1941), German politician who served as mayor of Cologne from 1907 to 1917
Ferdinand Franz Wallraf (20 July 1748 - 18 March 1824), German botanist,  mathematician, theologian, art collector and Roman Catholic priest

Surnames
Surnames of German origin